Antiochus Chuzon (floruit 429–438), called "the Elder" to distinguish him from his nephew, was a high official of the Eastern Roman Empire, praetorian prefect of the East and consul, who was a key figure in the compilation of the Codex Theodosianus.

Life 
Born in Antioch, in 429 he was quaestor sacri palatii when Emperor Theodosius II (r. 402–450) appointed him member of the first commission that was to formulate the Codex Theodosianus (March 26).

Later he was appointed praetorian prefect of the East, an office he held between 430 and 431. During his tenure, he exchanged letters with Theodoret, organised with Nestorius his return to the East through Asia Minor and Pontus, and rebuilt the city walls of Antioch.

In 431 he was appointed consul by the Eastern court, with Anicius Auchenius Bassus as Western colleague.

In 435 he was appointed member of the second commission for the formulation of the Codex Theodosianus. When the Codex was issued in 438, Antiochus was listed among its formulators.

He died between 438 and 444.

References and sources
References

Sources
 Jones, Arnold Hugh Martin, John Robert Martindale, John Morris, "Antiochus (Chuzon I) 7", Prosopography of the Later Roman Empire, Volume 2, Cambridge University Press, 1980, pp. 103–104.

5th-century deaths
5th-century Byzantine people
5th-century Roman consuls
Correspondents of Theodoret
Imperial Roman consuls
People from Antioch
Praetorian prefects of the East
Year of birth unknown